Atakan Alaftargil (born November 9, 1976) is a retired Olympian alpine skier from Turkey, who competed in slalom and giant slalom events.

Early life
Atakan Alaftargil was born on November 9, 1976, in Erzurum, Turkey. He is a member of a skiing family, his father İlhani having owned a ski equipment store at Palandöken Mountain and his three older brothers being skiers. His older brother Arif Alaftargil competed at the 1998 Winter Olympics in Nagano, Japan.

He began skiing at the age of six. He graduated from Atatürk University with a degree in physical education and sports. He is also a certified coach for skiing and snow boarding.

Career
He competed for Turkey at the 2002 Winter Olympics after participating at the 2001 World Alpine Ski Championships in St. Anton, Austria.

References

External links
 
 

1976 births
People from Erzurum
Atatürk University alumni
Turkish male alpine skiers
Olympic alpine skiers of Turkey
Alpine skiers at the 2002 Winter Olympics
Living people
20th-century Turkish people